An EMD GP40X is a 4-axle diesel-electric locomotive built by General Motors Electro-Motive Division between December 1977 and June 1978. Power for this unit was provided by a turbocharged 16-cylinder EMD 645F engine which could produce . 23 examples of this locomotive were built for North American railroads. This unit was a pre-production version meant to test technologies later incorporated into EMD's 50-series locomotives GP50 and SD50.

Design 
Ten GP40X were delivered with an experimental HT-B truck design that became an option (but never used) on the production GP50, including 6 for Union Pacific and 4 for Southern Pacific. These trucks were meant to improve locomotive adhesion. The remainder rode on Blomberg-M trucks.

SP's units included several experimental modifications, including L-shaped windshields and coverings over the radiator sections, nicknamed "elephant ears."

1965 experimental locomotive 
The designation GP40X was also given to an experimental locomotive built on an EMD GP35 frame in May 1965. Only one example of this locomotive was ever produced, the EMD 433A, a  test prototype that was the first 4-axle locomotive to be powered by the new 645-series prime mover. The 433A served as the precursor to the EMD GP40.  The 433A was purchased by the Illinois Central Railroad, and became the IC 3075. The 1965 EMD 433A has very little in common with the 1977 GP40X other than flared radiators and a 645-series prime mover.

Original owners

References

External links

 Sarberenyi, Robert. EMD GP40X Original Owners. Retrieved on August 27, 2006
 Thompson, J. David. EMD GP35 Original Owners, GP40 Prototype. Retrieved on August 27, 2006
 Kristopans, Andre J. http://utahrails.net/ajkristopans/50SERIES.htm 

GP40X
B-B locomotives
Experimental locomotives
Diesel-electric locomotives of the United States
Railway locomotives introduced in 1977
Standard gauge locomotives of the United States